The Ukrainian American Coordinating Council or UACC is a non-partisan not-for-profit national umbrella organization uniting many Ukrainian American organizations in advocating for over 1,000,000 Americans of Ukrainian descent. Its membership is composed of fraternal, educational, veterans, religious, cultural, social, business, political and humanitarian organizations, as well as individuals. Established in 1965, the UACC maintains local all-volunteer chapters across the United States, with a national office based in New York City, as well as a San Francisco, CA. The UACC is a member of the Ukrainian World Congress (UWC), the international assembly of nearly all Ukrainian public organizations in the worldwide Ukrainian diaspora of over 20 million people.

Today, it continues to embrace Ukrainian Historical, Political and Cultural heritage in the San Francisco Bay Area and California by sponsoring such events as concerts honoring Taras Shevchenko over the past 50 years, Ukrainian Independence Day in Golden Gate Park since 1964, the celebration of Ukraine’s Millennium baptism into Christianity, the Commemoration of the Soviet artificially induced famine of 1932-1933 in Ukraine called the Holodomor where ten million Ukrainians were victims as well as many other events and activities such as candlelight vigils, humanitarian aid for displaced citizens and soldiers, youth concerts, bonfires on the beach and the establishment and dedication of California Registered Historical Landmark No.1025 - Ukraine - honoring Ukrainian Patriot Reverend Father Agapius Honcharenko, fighter for freedom, democracy and human rights.

See also
 Ukraine–United States relations
 Senate Ukraine Caucus
 Ukrainian World Congress
 Ukrainian diaspora
 Ukrainian Americans
 Ukrainian Congress Committee of America
 The Federation of Ukrainian Student Organizations of America (SUSTA)
 Ukrainian National Women's League of America
 Ukrainian Catholic Archeparchy of Philadelphia
 Ukrainian Orthodox Church of the USA
 List of Ukrainian enclaves in North American cities
 Ukrainian Americans in New York City
 Ukrainian Americans in Los Angeles
 Ukrainian Village, Chicago
 Ukrainian Association of Washington State
 History of the Ukrainians in Baltimore
 Crimean Tatar diaspora
 Joint Baltic American National Committee
 Polish American Congress
 Belarusan-American Association

References 

American people of Ukrainian descent
European-American society
Ukrainian American
Organizations established in 1940
Ukrainian-American culture
Ukrainian-American history
Organizations based in San Francisco
Organizations based in New York City
1965 establishments in California